The Central Indiana Region of Ivy Tech Community College serves Marion County and eight other counties (Boone, Hamilton, Hancock, Hendricks, Johnson, Morgan, Putnam and Shelby).

Other class locations: Avon, Beech Grove High School, Center Grove High School, Franklin, Greencastle, Indian Creek Learning Center, Indy West, Lawrence, Mooresville, Noblesville, Pike High School, Shelbyville. List of Locations

Classes are offered at fifteen locations within the region.

Notable people
Gary Webb - American investigative journalist

References

Cent
Educational institutions established in 1963
Education in Marion County, Indiana
Education in Boone County, Indiana
Education in Hancock County, Indiana
Education in Johnson County, Indiana
Education in Shelby County, Indiana
Education in Indianapolis
1963 establishments in Indiana
Universities and colleges in Indianapolis